David or Dave Ball may refer to:

Music
 Dave Ball (guitarist) (1950–2015), guitarist formerly of Procol Harum, Bedlam, Long John Baldry, etc.
 David Ball (country singer) (born 1953), American country singer
 David Ball (album), a 1994 album by this artist
 David Ball (electronic musician) (born 1959), English electronic musician (usually known as Dave), member of Soft Cell, The Grid
 Dave "Taif" Ball, British bass guitarist with metal bands Killing Joke and Voodoocult

Sports
 Dave Ball (defensive end) (born 1981), American football player
 David Ball (wide receiver) (born 1984), American football player
 David Ball (footballer) (born 1989), English footballer
 David Ball (sport shooter), British sport shooter

Other
 David Ball (bishop) (1926–2017), Episcopal bishop of Albany, NY
 David W. Ball (born 1949), American novelist
 Dave Ball, Survivor: Samoa competitor